United Nations Security Council Resolution 178, adopted unanimously on April 24, 1963, after hearing of violations of Senegalese territory by Portuguese military forces from Portuguese Guinea, the Council deplored the incident at Bouniak as well as any incursion by the Portuguese and requested that they honor their declared intention to "scrupulously respect the sovereignty and territorial integrity of Senegal".

See also
List of United Nations Security Council Resolutions 101 to 200 (1953–1965)
Portuguese Colonial War

References
Text of the Resolution at undocs.org

External links
 

 0178
 0178
 0178
 0178
Portuguese Guinea
1963 in Portugal
1963 in Senegal
1963 in Portuguese Guinea
April 1963 events